WBOL (1560 AM) is a radio station licensed to Bolivar, Tennessee, United States. The station is owned by Shaw's Broadcasting Co.

History
The station was assigned the call letters February 13, 1984. On April 29, 1985, the station changed its call sign to WQKZ and on March 1, 1986 to the current WBOL.

References

External links

BOL
Oldies radio stations in the United States
BOL